Ervy-le-Châtel is a commune in the Aube department in north-east France.

Population

Sights
Arboretum Saint-Antoine
Round hall
Porte Saint-Nicolas

See also
Communes of the Aube department

References

Communes of Aube
Aube communes articles needing translation from French Wikipedia